Jörgen Olsson (born 20 March 1976) is a retired Swedish badminton player from Göteborgs BK club. He also once played for Askim BC club. He has represented Sweden in World Championships and is a 2-time national Champion having won the titles in 2002 and 2004 in mixed doubles with Frida Andreasson and Johanna Persson respectively.

Achievements

IBF/BWF International 
Men's doubles

Mixed doubles

References 

1976 births
Living people
Swedish male badminton players